Martha Rocío Partida Guzmán (born 12 January 1978) is a Mexican politician from the Institutional Revolutionary Party. From 2008 to 2009 she served as Deputy of the LX Legislature of the Mexican Congress representing Nayarit.

References

1978 births
Living people
Politicians from Nayarit
Women members of the Chamber of Deputies (Mexico)
Institutional Revolutionary Party politicians
21st-century Mexican politicians
21st-century Mexican women politicians
Deputies of the LX Legislature of Mexico
Members of the Chamber of Deputies (Mexico) for Nayarit
People from Tecuala